Dominic Hoffman is an American actor and playwright. He is known for his recurring roles on The Shield as Louis Sperling, A Different World as Whitley's boyfriend, Julian Day, and Grey's Anatomy as Dr. Jeff Russell.

He is also an accomplished theater actor and playwright, earning Ovation awards in 2000 for his one-man show "Uncle Jacques' Symphony," a play that celebrates humanity as a musical metaphor. Its participants are a group of singular characters, all performed by Hoffman, with minimal alteration, played to maximum effect. Men and women, young and old, of different cultures and beliefs vividly come together on stage for ninety minutes. Their personal rhythms, unique harmonies, and the familiar melody of their stories combine to form a symphony of life. Ovation awards for best actor in a play, writing, and best world premiere.

Hoffman is also a distinguished audiobook narrator, winning the 2017 Audie Award for Literary Fiction or Classics for his rendition of  Yaa Gyasi's Homegoing. He has also been a finalist for two other Audie Awards and an Odyssey Award.

Personal life and education 
Hoffman received a Bachelor of Arts in English Literature from the University of California, Santa Cruz. He also received training from the American Conservatory Theater, London Academy of Music and Dramatic Arts, and New York University Tisch School of the Arts.

Hoffman presently lives in Venice, California and spends time in Paris annually.

Awards and honors

Awards 
Best Play at the Edinburgh International Festival, Best Of The Fringe at the San Francisco Fringe Festival, and LA Ovation Awards (Best Writer Of A World Premiere Play & Best Lead Actor In A Play), as writer/actor for Uncle Jacques’ Symphony. Click here for reviews.

"Best of" lists

Filmography

Film

Television

References

External links

Dominic Hoffman Facebook Page
Dominic Hoffman Ovation Award LA Times 2000

Living people
20th-century American male actors
21st-century American male actors
American male film actors
African-American male actors
American male television actors
20th-century African-American people
21st-century African-American people
1962 births